Kocuria rosea is a gram-positive bacteria that is catalase-positive and oxidase-positive. It has a coccus shape that occurs in the tetrad arrangement and is a strict aerobe that grows best from 25 to 37 °C. K. rosea has also been found to cause urinary tract infections in people with weakened immune systems.

The normal habitat for this Kocuria species is skin, soil, and water. It derives its name from the carotenoid pigment that it secretes. Isolated colonies on a TSA plate are circular, 1.0–1.5 mm in size, slightly convex, smooth, and pink in color.

Metabolism
K. rosea has been found to be able to biodegrade malachite green, azo dyes, triphenylmethane, as well as some other industrial dyes. Due to its ability to biodegrade these dyes, it has become of interest as a potential means to biodegrade dyes that would otherwise take a long time to naturally break down. It also has been found to have the ability to perform keratin hydrolysis through the production of keratinases.

References

External links
Type strain of Kocuria rosea at BacDive -  the Bacterial Diversity Metadatabase

Micrococcaceae
Bacteria described in 1886